The 1924–25 Allsvenskan, part of the 1924–25 Swedish football season, was the inaugural season of Sweden's new first-tier football league, replacing Svenska Serien, which had been the name of the top tier since 1910. The first match was played on 3 August 1924 and the last match was played on 7 June 1925. GAIS won the league ahead of runners-up IFK Göteborg, while Västerås IK and Hammarby IF were relegated.

A total of 12 teams participated in the league; 11 teams had played in Svenska Serien for the 1923–24 season and one team, Västerås IK, had played in Division 2.

Participating clubs

League table

Promotions, relegations and qualifications

Results

Attendances

Top scorers

References 

Print

Online

Allsvenskan seasons
1924–25 in Swedish association football leagues
Sweden